Panorama Coaches is a bus and coach operator in Melbourne, Victoria, Australia. It operates four routes under contract to Public Transport Victoria. It is a subsidiary of the Dineen Group.

History
In September 1949, Don Nugent and W McKenzie purchased Panorama Bus Service from H Jewell with route 699 from Belgrave to Upwey. The business was sold in August 1953 to Messrs Ashby and Jewell and for the next nine years, Nugent operated a taxi company. In November 1962, he purchased Boronia Bus Lines. A charter operation was established under the name Australian Rambler Coaches and the route services sold in September 1970 to Ventura Bus Lines. 

In October 1985, Nugent became a shareholder in the Clipper Tours business in Sydney. The Australian Rambler livery was adopted and a few coaches transferred.

In January 1989, Australian Rambler Coaches was sold to Cobb & Co with Nugent retaining a 15 coaches and reactivating the Panorama Coaches name. In October 1990, Panorama Coaches was sold to the Dineen Group with 13 buses and coaches.

In May 1991, Hurstbridge Coaches was purchased by the Dineen Group. Both operations were later consolidated under the Panorama Coaches name.

Fleet
As at June 2022, the fleet consisted of 94 buses and coaches. Fleet livery is white with maroon and blue stripes while some route buses carry the Public Transport Victoria orange and white livery.

References

External links

Company website

Bus companies of Victoria (Australia)
Bus transport in Melbourne